Shijiazhuang TV Tower is a  tall free standing lattice tower used for communication built in 1998 in the city of Shijiazhuang, China.

See also  
 List of towers
 Lattice tower
 List of tallest freestanding steel structures
 List of tallest buildings in Shijiazhuang

References

External links

 http://www.gakei.com/sjw/sjwv.htm
 http://skyscraperpage.com/gallery/showphoto.php?photo=51261&papass=&sort=1
 http://www.skyscraperpage.com/diagrams/?b21715

Towers in China
Buildings and structures in Hebei
Lattice towers